In this article, Europe refers to the geographical continent, not the somewhat larger Western Palearctic, which includes parts of the Middle East and north Africa.

There are 930 species of bird in the area, and in general the avifauna is similar to Asia north of the Himalayas, which is also in the Palearctic realm. There are also many groups shared with North America. 65 species are globally threatened, 4 species are extinct, and 18 species are introduced by people.

Conversely, many of the Southern Hemisphere groups, including the ancient flightless  Struthioniformes (ostrich order), and their relatives the tinamous are not represented at all.

The order follows the IOC World Bird List version 12.2.

The following tags have been used to highlight several categories. The commonly occurring native species do not fall into any of these categories.

 (A) Accidental - a species that rarely or accidentally occurs in Europe
 (E) Endemic - a species endemic to Europe
 (Ext) Extinct - a species that no longer exists
 (Ex) Extirpated - a species that is extinct in the wild in Europe
 (I) Introduced - a species introduced to Europe as a consequence, direct or indirect, of human actions

Guineafowl
Order: GalliformesFamily: Numididae

Guineafowl are a group of African, seed-eating, ground-nesting birds that resemble partridges, but with featherless heads and spangled grey plumage. 

Helmeted guineafowl, Numida meleagris (I)

Pheasants and allies
Order: GalliformesFamily: Phasianidae

Pheasants and allies are terrestrial species, feeding and nesting on the ground. They are variable in size but generally plump, with broad and relatively short wings.

Hazel grouse, Tetrastes bonasia
Western capercaillie, Tetrao urogallus
Black grouse, Lyrurus tetrix
Rock ptarmigan, Lagopus muta
Willow ptarmigan, Lagopus lagopus
Rock partridge, Alectoris graeca
Chukar partridge, Alectoris chukar
Barbary partridge, Alectoris barbara
Red-legged partridge, Alectoris rufa
Black francolin, Francolinus francolinus (Ex)
Grey partridge, Perdix perdix
Common quail, Coturnix coturnix
Reeves's pheasant, Syrmaticus reevesii (I)
Common pheasant, Phasianus colchicus (I)
Golden pheasant, Chrysolophus pictus (I)
Lady Amherst's pheasant, Chrysolophus amherstiae (I)

Ducks, geese, and swans
Order: AnseriformesFamily: Anatidae

The swans, ducks and geese are medium to large birds that are adapted to an aquatic existence with webbed feet and bills which are flattened to a greater or lesser extent. In many ducks the male is colourful while the female is dull brown. The diet consists of a variety of animals and plants. The family is well represented in Europe with many introduced species as well.

White-faced whistling duck, Dendrocygna viduata (A)
Brant goose, Branta bernicla
Red-breasted goose, Branta ruficollis
Canada goose, Branta canadensis 
Barnacle goose, Branta leucopsis
Cackling goose, Branta hutchinsii (A)
Bar-headed goose, Anser indicus (A)
Ross's goose, Anser rossii (A)
Snow goose, Anser caerulescens 
Greylag goose, Anser anser
Taiga bean goose, Anser fabalis
Pink-footed goose, Anser brachyrhynchus
Tundra bean goose, Anser serrirostris
Greater white-fronted goose, Anser albifrons
Lesser white-fronted goose, Anser erythropus
Mute swan, Cygnus olor
Tundra swan, Cygnus columbianus
Whooper swan, Cygnus cygnus
Egyptian goose, Alopochen aegyptiaca 
Common shelduck, Tadorna tadorna
Ruddy shelduck, Tadorna ferruginea
Wood duck, Aix sponsa 
Mandarin duck, Aix galericulata (I)
Baikal teal, Sibirionetta formosa (A)
Garganey, Spatula querquedula
Cinnamon teal, Spatula cyanoptera (A)
Blue-winged teal, Spatula discors (A)
Northern shoveler, Spatula clypeata
Gadwall, Mareca strepera
Falcated duck, Mareca falcata (A)
Eurasian wigeon, Mareca penelope
American wigeon, Mareca americana (A)
Mallard, Anas platyrhynchos
American black duck, Anas rubripes (A)
Northern pintail, Anas acuta
Eurasian teal, Anas crecca
Green-winged teal, Anas carolinensis 
Marbled duck, Marmaronetta angustirostris
Red-crested pochard, Netta rufina
Canvasback, Aythya valisineria (A)
Redhead, Aythya americana (A) 
Common pochard, Aythya ferina
Ferruginous duck, Aythya nyroca
Ring-necked duck, Aythya collaris (A)
Tufted duck, Aythya fuligula
Greater scaup, Aythya marila
Lesser scaup, Aythya affinis (A)
Steller's eider, Polysticta stelleri
Spectacled eider, Somateria fischeri (A)
King eider,  Somateria spectabilis
Common eider, Somateria mollissima
Harlequin duck, Histrionicus histrionicus
Surf scoter, Melanitta perspicillata (A)
Velvet scoter, Melanitta fusca
White-winged scoter, Melanitta deglandi 
Stejneger's scoter, Melanitta stejnegeri
Common scoter, Melanitta nigra
Black scoter, Melanitta americana 
Long-tailed duck, Clangula hyemalis
Bufflehead, Bucephala albeola (A)
Common goldeneye, Bucephala clangula
Barrow's goldeneye, Bucephala islandica
Smew, Mergellus albellus
Hooded merganser, Lophodytes cucullatus (A)
Common merganser, Mergus merganser
Red-breasted merganser, Mergus serrator
Ruddy duck, Oxyura jamaicensis
White-headed duck, Oxyura leucocephala

Nightjars
Order: CaprimulgiformesFamily: Caprimulgidae

Nightjars are medium-sized nocturnal birds that usually nest on the ground. They have long wings, short legs and very short bills. Their soft plumage is cryptically coloured to resemble bark or leaves. 

Common nighthawk, Chordeiles minor (A)
Red-necked nightjar, Caprimulgus ruficollis
European nightjar, Caprimulgus europaeus
Egyptian nightjar, Caprimulgus aegyptius (A)

Swifts
Order: ApodiformesFamily: Apodidae

Swifts are small birds which spend the majority of their lives flying. These birds have very short legs and never settle voluntarily on the ground, perching instead only on vertical surfaces.

White-throated needletail, Hirundapus caudacutus (A)
Chimney swift, Chaetura pelagica (A)
Alpine swift, Tachymarptis melba
Common swift, Apus apus
Plain swift, Apus unicolor
Pallid swift, Apus pallidus
Pacific swift, Apus pacifica (A)
Little swift, Apus affinis
White-rumped swift, Apus caffer

Bustards
Order: OtidiformesFamily: Otididae

Bustards are large terrestrial birds mainly associated with dry open country and steppes in the Old World. They are omnivorous and nest on the ground. They walk steadily on strong legs and big toes, pecking for food as they go. They have long broad wings with "fingered" wingtips and striking patterns in flight. Many have interesting mating displays.

Great bustard, Otis tarda
Houbara bustard, Chlamydotis undulata (A)
Macqueen's bustard, Chlamydotis macqueenii (A)
Little bustard, Tetrax tetrax

Cuckoos
Order: CuculiformesFamily: Cuculidae

The family Cuculidae includes cuckoos, roadrunners and anis. These birds are of variable size with slender bodies, long tails and strong legs. The Old World cuckoos are brood parasites.

Great spotted cuckoo, Clamator glandarius
Yellow-billed cuckoo, Coccyzus americanus (A)
Black-billed cuckoo, Coccyzus erythropthalmus (A)
Rufous hawk-cuckoo, Hierococcyx hyperythrus (A)
Himalayan cuckoo, Cuculus saturatus (A)
Oriental cuckoo, Cuculus optatus (A)
Common cuckoo, Cuculus canorus

Sandgrouse
Order: PterocliformesFamily: Pteroclidae

Sandgrouse have small, pigeon like heads and necks, but sturdy compact bodies. They have long pointed wings and sometimes tails and a fast direct flight. Flocks fly to watering holes at dawn and dusk. Their legs are feathered down to the toes.

Pallas's sandgrouse, Syrrhaptes paradoxus (A)
Pin-tailed sandgrouse, Pterocles alchata
Black-bellied sandgrouse, Pterocles orientalis

Pigeons and doves
Order: ColumbiformesFamily: Columbidae

Pigeons and doves are stout-bodied birds with short necks and short slender bills with a fleshy cere.

Rock dove, Columba livia
Stock dove, Columba oenas
Common wood pigeon, Columba palumbus
Trocaz pigeon, Columba trocaz
Bolle's pigeon, Columba bollii
Laurel pigeon, Columba junoniae
European turtle dove, Streptopelia turtur
Oriental turtle dove, Streptopelia orientalis (A)
Eurasian collared dove, Streptopelia decaocto
African collared dove, Streptopelia roseogrisea (I)
Laughing dove, Streptopelia senegalensis
Passenger pigeon, Ectopistes migratorius (Ext)
Mourning dove, Zenaida macroura (A)
Zenaida dove, Zenaida aurita (A)

Rails, crakes, and coots
Order: GruiformesFamily: Rallidae

Rallidae is a family of small to medium-sized birds which includes the rails, crakes, coots and gallinules. Typically they inhabit dense vegetation in damp environments near lakes, swamps or rivers. In general they are shy and secretive birds, making them difficult to observe. Most species have strong legs and long toes which are well adapted to soft uneven surfaces. They tend to have short, rounded wings and to be weak fliers.

Virginia rail, Rallus limicola (A)
Water rail, Rallus aquaticus
African crake, Crecopsis egregia (A)
Corn crake, Crex crex
Sora, Porzana carolina (A)
Spotted crake, Porzana porzana
Lesser moorhen, Paragallinula angulata (A)
Common gallinule, Gallinula galeata (A)
Common moorhen, Gallinula chloropus
Eurasian coot, Fulica atra
Red-knobbed coot, Fulica cristata
American coot, Fulica americana (A)
Allen's gallinule, Porphyrio alleni (A)
Purple gallinule, Porphyrio martinica (A)
Western swamphen, Porphyrio porphyrio
African swamphen, Porphyrio madagascariensis (A)
Grey-headed swamphen, Porphyrio poliocephalus (A)
Baillon's crake, Zapornia pusilla
Little crake, Zapornia parva
Striped crake, Aenigmatolimnas marginalis (A)
Watercock, Gallicrex cinerea (A)

Cranes
Order: GruiformesFamily: Gruidae

Cranes are large, long-legged and long-necked birds. Unlike the similar-looking but unrelated herons, cranes fly with necks outstretched, not pulled back. Most have elaborate and noisy courting displays or "dances".

Siberian crane, Leucogeranus leucogeranus 
Sandhill crane, Antigone canadensis (A)
Demoiselle crane, Grus virgo
Common crane, Grus grus
Hooded crane, Grus monacha (A)

Grebes
Order: PodicipediformesFamily: Podicipedidae

Grebes are small to medium-large diving birds with lobed toes and pointed bills. They are seen mainly on lowland waterbodies and coasts. They feed on aquatic animals and nest on a floating platform of vegetation.

Little grebe, Tachybaptus ruficollis
Pied-billed grebe, Podilymbus podiceps (A)
Red-necked grebe, Podiceps grisegena
Great crested grebe, Podiceps cristatus
Horned grebe, Podiceps auritus
Black-necked grebe, Podiceps nigricollis

Flamingos
Order: PhoenicopteriformesFamily: Phoenicopteridae

Flamingos filter-feed on shellfish and algae. Their oddly shaped beaks are specially adapted to separate mud and silt from the food they consume and, uniquely, are used upside-down.

Greater flamingo, Phoenicopterus roseus
American flamingo, Phoenicopterus ruber (A)
Lesser flamingo, Phoenicopterus minor (A)

Buttonquail
Order: CharadriiformesFamily: Turnicidae

The buttonquail are small, drab, running birds which resemble the true quails. The female is the brighter of the sexes and initiates courtship. The male incubates the eggs and tends the young.

Common buttonquail, Turnix sylvaticus

Stone-curlews and thick-knees
Order: CharadriiformesFamily: Burhinidae

The thick-knees are a group of largely tropical waders in the family Burhinidae. They are found worldwide within the tropical zone, with some species also breeding in temperate Europe and Australia. They are medium to large waders with strong black or yellow-black bills, large yellow eyes and cryptic plumage. Despite being classed as waders, most species have a preference for arid or semi-arid habitats.

Eurasian stone-curlew, Burhinus oedicnemus

Oystercatchers
Order: CharadriiformesFamily: Haematopodidae

The oystercatchers are large and noisy plover-like birds, with strong bills used for smashing or prising open molluscs.

American oystercatcher, Haematopus palliatus (A)
Canary Islands oystercatcher, Haematopus meadewaldoi (Ext)
Eurasian oystercatcher, Haematopus ostralegus

Stilts and avocets
Order: CharadriiformesFamily: Recurvirostridae

A family of fairly large wading birds. The avocets have long legs and long up-curved bills. The stilts have extremely long legs and long, thin, straight bills.

Black-winged stilt, Himantopus himantopus
Pied avocet, Recurvirostra avosetta
American avocet, Recurvirostra americana (A)

Plovers
Order: CharadriiformesFamily: Charadriidae

Small to medium-sized wading birds with compact bodies, short, thick necks and long, usually pointed, wings. They are found in open country worldwide, mostly in habitats near water.

Northern lapwing, Vanellus vanellus
Spur-winged lapwing, Vanellus spinosus
Grey-headed lapwing, Vanellus cinereus (A)
Sociable lapwing, Vanellus gregarius (A)
White-tailed lapwing, Vanellus leucurus (A)
European golden plover, Pluvialis apricaria
Pacific golden plover, Pluvialis fulva (A)
American golden plover, Pluvialis dominica (A)
Grey plover, Pluvialis squatarola
Common ringed plover, Charadrius hiaticula
Semipalmated plover, Charadrius semipalmatus (A)
Little ringed plover, Charadrius dubius
Killdeer, Charadrius vociferus (A)
Kittlitz's plover, Charadrius pecuarius (A)
Kentish plover, Charadrius alexandrinus
Lesser sand plover, Charadrius mongolus (A)
Greater sand plover, Charadrius leschenaultii (A)
Caspian plover, Charadrius asiaticus (A)
Oriental plover, Charadrius veredus (A)
Eurasian dotterel, Charadrius morinellus

Painted-snipes
Order: CharadriiformesFamily: Rostratulidae

Painted-snipes are short-legged, long-billed birds similar in shape to the true snipes, but more brightly coloured.

Greater painted-snipe, Rostratula benghalensis

Sandpipers and snipes
Order: CharadriiformesFamily: Scolopacidae

Scolopacidae is a large diverse family of small to medium-sized shorebirds including the sandpipers, curlews, godwits, shanks, tattlers, woodcocks, snipes, dowitchers and phalaropes. The majority of these species eat small invertebrates picked out of the mud or soil. Variation in length of legs and bills enables multiple species to feed in the same habitat, particularly on the coast, without direct competition for food.

Upland sandpiper, Bartramia longicauda (A)
Eurasian whimbrel, Numenius phaeopus
Hudsonian whimbrel, Numenius hudsonicus (A)
Little curlew, Numenius minutus (A)
Eskimo curlew, Numenius borealis (A)
Slender-billed curlew, Numenius tenuirostris (A)
Eurasian curlew, Numenius arquata
Bar-tailed godwit, Limosa lapponica
Black-tailed godwit, Limosa limosa
Hudsonian godwit, Limosa haemastica (A)
Ruddy turnstone, Arenaria interpres
Great knot, Calidris tenuirostris (A)
Red knot, Calidris canutus
Ruff, Calidris pugnax
Broad-billed sandpiper, Calidris falcinellus
Sharp-tailed sandpiper, Calidris acuminata (A)
Stilt sandpiper, Calidris himantopus (A)
Curlew sandpiper, Calidris ferruginea
Temminck's stint, Calidris temminckii
Long-toed stint, Calidris subminuta (A)
Spoon-billed sandpiper, Calidris pygmeus (A)
Red-necked stint, Calidris ruficollis (A)
Sanderling, Calidris alba
Dunlin, Calidris alpina
Purple sandpiper, Calidris maritima
Baird's sandpiper, Calidris bairdii (A)
Little stint, Calidris minuta
Least sandpiper, Calidris minutilla (A)
White-rumped sandpiper, Calidris fuscicollis (A)
Buff-breasted sandpiper, Calidris subruficollis (A)
Pectoral sandpiper, Calidris melanotos (A)
Semipalmated sandpiper, Calidris pusilla (A)
Western sandpiper, Calidris mauri (A)
Long-billed dowitcher, Limnodromus scolopaceus (A)
Short-billed dowitcher, Limnodromus griseus (A)
Eurasian woodcock, Scolopax rusticola
American woodcock, Scolopax minor (A)
Jack snipe, Lymnocryptes minimus
Pin-tailed snipe, Gallinago stenura (A)
Swinhoe's snipe, Gallinago megala (A)
Great snipe, Gallinago media
Common snipe, Gallinago gallinago
Wilson's snipe, Gallinago delicata (A)
Terek sandpiper, Xenus cinereus
Wilson's phalarope, Phalaropus tricolor (A)
Red-necked phalarope, Phalaropus lobatus
Red phalarope, Phalaropus fulicarius
Common sandpiper, Actitis hypoleucos
Spotted sandpiper, Actitis macularius (A)
Green sandpiper, Tringa ochropus
Solitary sandpiper, Tringa solitaria (A)
Grey-tailed tattler, Tringa brevipes (A)
Lesser yellowlegs, Tringa flavipes (A)
Willet, Tringa semipalmata (A)
Common redshank, Tringa totanus
Marsh sandpiper, Tringa stagnatilis
Wood sandpiper, Tringa glareola
Spotted redshank, Tringa erythropus
Common greenshank, Tringa nebularia
Greater yellowlegs, Tringa melanoleuca (A)

Coursers and pratincoles
Order: CharadriiformesFamily: Glareolidae

Glareolidae is a family of wading birds comprising the pratincoles, which have short legs, long pointed wings and long forked tails, and the coursers, which have long legs, short wings and long, pointed bills which curve downwards.

Cream-colored courser, Cursorius cursor (A)
Collared pratincole, Glareola pratincola
Oriental pratincole, Glareola maldivarum (A)
Black-winged pratincole, Glareola nordmanni (A)

Gulls, terns and skimmers
Order: CharadriiformesFamily: Laridae

Laridae is a family of medium to large seabirds, the gulls, terns, and skimmers. They are typically grey or white, often with black markings on the head or wings. They have stout, longish bills and webbed feet. Terns are a group of generally medium to large seabirds typically with grey or white plumage, often with black markings on the head. Most terns hunt fish by diving but some pick insects off the surface of fresh water. Terns are generally long-lived birds, with several species known to live in excess of 30 years.

Brown noddy, Anous stolidus (A)
Black skimmer, Rynchops niger (A)
Black-legged kittiwake, Rissa tridactyla
Ivory gull, Pagophila eburnea (A)
Sabine's gull, Xema sabini
Slender-billed gull, Chroicocephalus genei (A)
Bonaparte's gull, Chroicocephalus philadelphia (A)
Black-headed gull, Chroicocephalus ridibundus
Grey-headed gull, Chroicocephalus cirrocephalus (A)
Little gull, Hydrocoloeus minutus
Ross's gull, Rhodostethia rosea (A)
Laughing gull, Leucophaeus atricilla (A)
Franklin's gull, Leucophaeus pipixcan (A)
Relict gull, Ichthyaetus relictus (A)
Audouin's gull, Ichthyaetus audouinii
Mediterranean gull, Ichthyaetus melanocephalus
Pallas's gull, Ichthyaetus ichthyaetus (A)
White-eyed gull, Ichthyaetus leucophthalmus (A)
Common gull, Larus canus
Short-billed gull, Larus brachyrhynchus (A)
Ring-billed gull, Larus delawarensis (A)
Great black-backed gull, Larus marinus
Kelp gull, Larus dominicanus (A)
Glaucous-winged gull, Larus glaucescens (A)
Glaucous gull, Larus hyperboreus
Iceland gull, Larus glaucoides
European herring gull, Larus argentatus
American herring gull, Larus smithsonianus
Vega gull, Larus vegae (A)
Caspian gull, Larus cachinnans
Yellow-legged gull, Larus michahellis
Armenian gull, Larus armenicus
Slaty-backed gull, Larus schistisagus (A)
Lesser black-backed gull, Larus fuscus
Gull-billed tern, Gelochelidon nilotica
Caspian tern, Hydroprogne caspia
Royal tern, Thalasseus maximus 
Lesser crested tern, Thalasseus bengalensis (A)
West African crested tern, Thalasseus albididorsalis (A)
Sandwich tern, Thalasseus sandvicensis
Cabot's tern, Thalasseus acuflavidus (A)
Elegant tern, Thalasseus elegans (A)
Little tern, Sternula albifrons
Saunders's tern, Sternula saundersi (A)
Least tern, Sternula antillarum (A)
Aleutian tern, Onychoprion aleuticus (A)
Bridled tern, Onychoprion anaethetus (A)
Sooty tern, Onychoprion fuscatus (A)
Roseate tern, Sterna dougallii
Common tern, Sterna hirundo
White-cheeked tern, Sterna repressa (A)
Arctic tern, Sterna paradisaea
Forster's tern, Sterna forsteri (A)
Whiskered tern, Chlidonias hybridus
White-winged tern, Chlidonias leucopterus
Black tern, Chlidonias niger

Skuas
Order: CharadriiformesFamily: Stercorariidae

The family Stercorariidae are, in general, medium to large birds, typically with grey or brown plumage, often with white markings on the wings. They nest on the ground in temperate and arctic regions and are long-distance migrants.

South polar skua, Stercorarius maccormicki (A)
Great skua, Stercorarius skua
Pomarine jaeger, Stercorarius pomarinus
Parasitic jaeger, Stercorarius parasiticus
Long-tailed jaeger, Stercorarius longicaudus

Auks
Order: CharadriiformesFamily: Alcidae

Auks are superficially similar to penguins due to their black-and-white colours, their upright posture and some of their habits, however they are not related to the penguins and differ in being able to fly. Auks live on the open sea, only deliberately coming ashore to nest.

Little auk, Alle alle
Thick-billed murre, Uria lomvia
Common murre, Uria aalge
Razorbill, Alca torda
Great auk, Pinguinus impennis (Ext)
Black guillemot, Cepphus grylle
Pigeon guillemot, Cepphus columba
Long-billed murrelet, Brachyramphus perdix (A)
Ancient murrelet, Synthliboramphus antiquus (A)
Parakeet auklet, Aethia psittacula (A)
Crested auklet, Aethia cristatella (A)
Atlantic puffin, Fratercula arctica
Horned puffin, Fratercula corniculata (A)
Tufted puffin, Fratercula cirrhata (A)

Tropicbirds
Order: PhaethontiformesFamily: Phaethontidae

Tropicbirds are a family of tropical pelagic seabirds. They are the sole living representatives of the order Phaethontiformes.

Red-billed tropicbird, Phaethon aethereus (A)
White-tailed tropicbird, Phaethon lepturus (A)

Loons
Order: GaviiformesFamily: Gaviidae

Loons, known as divers in Europe, are a group of aquatic birds found in many parts of North America and northern Europe. They are the size of a large duck or small goose, which they somewhat resemble when swimming, but to which they are completely unrelated.

Red-throated loon, Gavia stellata
Black-throated loon, Gavia arctica
Pacific loon, Gavia pacifica (A)
Common loon, Gavia immer
Yellow-billed loon, Gavia adamsii

Austral storm petrels
Order: ProcellariiformesFamily: Oceanitidae

Austral storm petrels, or southern storm petrels, are  seabirds in the family Oceanitidae, part of the order Procellariiformes. These smallest of seabirds feed on planktonic crustaceans and small fish picked from the surface, typically while hovering. Their flight is fluttering and sometimes bat-like.

Wilson's storm petrel, Oceanites oceanicus
White-faced storm petrel, Pelagodroma marina 
Black-bellied storm petrel, Fregetta tropica (A)

Albatrosses
Order: ProcellariiformesFamily: Diomedeidae

The albatrosses are among the largest flying birds, with long, narrow wings for gliding. The majority are found in the Southern Hemisphere with only vagrants occurring in the North Atlantic.

Wandering albatross, Diomedea exulans (A)
Tristan albatross, Diomedea dabbenena (A)
Black-browed albatross, Thalassarche melanophris (A)
Atlantic yellow-nosed albatross, Thalassarche chlororhynchos (A)

Northern storm petrels
Order: ProcellariiformesFamily: Hydrobatidae

The northern storm-petrels are the smallest seabirds, feeding on plankton and small fish picked from the surface, typically while hovering. They nest in colonies on the ground, most often in burrows.

European storm petrel, Hydrobates pelagicus
Band-rumped storm petrel, Hydrobates castro
Monteiro's storm petrel, Hydrobates monteiroi
Swinhoe's storm petrel, Hydrobates monorhis (A)
Leach's storm petrel, Hydrobates leucorhea

Petrels and shearwaters
Order: ProcellariiformesFamily: Procellariidae

These are highly pelagic birds with long, narrow wings and tube-shaped nostrils. They feed at sea on fish, squid and other marine life. They come to land to breed in colonies, nesting in burrows or on cliffs.

Southern giant petrel, Macronectes giganteus (A)
Northern fulmar, Fulmarus glacialis
Cape petrel, Daption capense (A)
Atlantic petrel, Pterodroma incerta (A)
Soft-plumaged petrel, Pterodroma mollis (A)
Zino's petrel, Pterodroma madeira 
Fea's petrel, Pterodroma feae 
Desertas petrel, Pterodroma deserta 
Bermuda petrel, Pterodroma cahow (A)
Black-capped petrel, Pterodroma hasitata (A)
Kermadec petrel, Pterodroma neglecta (A)
Herald petrel, Pterodroma heraldica (A)
Trindade petrel, Pterodroma arminjoniana (A)
White-chinned petrel, Procellaria aequinoctialis (A)
Scopoli's shearwater, Calonectris diomedea
Cory's shearwater, Calonectris borealis
Cape Verde shearwater, Calonectris edwardsii
Sooty shearwater, Ardenna grisea
Short-tailed shearwater, Ardenna tenuirostris (A)
Great shearwater, Ardenna gravis
Manx shearwater, Puffinus puffinus
Yelkouan shearwater, Puffinus yelkouan
Balearic shearwater, Puffinus mauretanicus
Audubon's shearwater, Puffinus lherminieri (A)
Barolo shearwater, Puffinus baroli 
Boyd's shearwater, Puffinus boydi (A)
Bulwer's petrel, Bulweria bulwerii

Storks
Order: CiconiiformesFamily: Ciconiidae

Storks are large, long-legged, long-necked, wading birds with long, stout bills. Storks are mute, but bill-clattering is an important mode of communication at the nest. Their nests can be large and may be reused for many years. Many species are migratory.

Yellow-billed stork, Mycteria ibis
Black stork, Ciconia nigra
White stork, Ciconia ciconia
Marabou stork, Leptoptilos crumenifer

Frigatebirds
Order: SuliformesFamily: Fregatidae

Frigatebirds are found across all tropical and subtropical oceans. All have predominantly black plumage, long, deeply forked tails and long hooked bills. Females have white underbellies and males have a distinctive red gular pouch, which they inflate during the breeding season to attract females. Their wings are long and pointed and can span up to 2.3 metres (7.5 ft), the largest wing area to body weight ratio of any bird.

Ascension frigatebird, Fregata aquila (A)
Magnificent frigatebird, Fregata magnificens (A)

Gannets and boobies
Order: SuliformesFamily: Sulidae

The sulids comprise the gannets and boobies. Both groups are medium-large coastal seabirds that plunge-dive for fish.

Northern gannet, Morus bassanus
Cape gannet, Morus capensis (A)
Masked booby, Sula dactylatra (A)
Red-footed booby, Sula sula (A)
Brown booby, Sula leucogaster (A)

Anhingas and darters
Order: SuliformesFamily: Anhingidae

Anhingas or darters are often called "snake-birds" because of their long thin neck, which gives a snake-like appearance when they swim with their bodies submerged. The males have black and dark-brown plumage, an erectile crest on the nape and a larger bill than the female. The females have much paler plumage especially on the neck and underparts. The darters have completely webbed feet and their legs are short and set far back on the body. Their plumage is somewhat permeable, like that of cormorants, and they spread their wings to dry after diving.

 African darter, Anhinga rufa

Cormorants and shags
Order: SuliformesFamily: Phalacrocoracidae

Cormorants are medium to large coastal, fish-eating seabirds. Plumage colouration varies, with the majority having mainly dark plumage, some species being black-and-white and a few being colourful.

Pygmy cormorant, Microcarbo pygmeus
White-breasted cormorant, Phalacrocorax lucidus
Great cormorant, Phalacrocorax carbo
Spectacled cormorant, Urile perspicillatus (Ext)
European shag, Gulosus aristotelis
Double-crested cormorant, Nannopterum auritum

Ibises and spoonbills
Order: PelecaniformesFamily: Threskiornithidae

A family of long-legged, long-necked wading birds. Ibises have long, curved bills. Spoonbills have a flattened bill, wider at the tip.

African sacred ibis, Threskiornis aethiopicus (I)
Northern bald ibis, Geronticus eremita (A)
Glossy ibis, Plegadis falcinellus
Eurasian spoonbill, Platalea leucorodia
African spoonbill, Platalea alba (A)

Herons and bitterns
Order: PelecaniformesFamily: Ardeidae

The family Ardeidae contains the bitterns, herons and egrets. Herons and egrets are medium to large wading birds with long necks and legs. Bitterns tend to be shorter necked and more wary. Members of Ardeidae fly with their necks retracted, unlike other long-necked birds such as storks, ibises and spoonbills.

Eurasian bittern, Botaurus stellaris
American bittern, Botaurus lentiginosus (A)
Least bittern, Ixobrychus exilis (A)
Little bittern, Ixobrychus minutus
Von Schrenck's bittern, Ixobrychus eurhythmus (A)
Dwarf bittern, Ixobrychus sturmii (A)
Black-crowned night heron, Nycticorax nycticorax
Yellow-crowned night heron, Nyctanassa violacea (A)
Green heron, Butorides virescens (A)
Striated heron, Butorides striata 
Squacco heron, Ardeola ralloides
Indian pond heron, Ardeola grayii (A)
Chinese pond heron, Ardeola bacchus (A)
Western cattle egret, Bubulcus ibis
Eastern cattle egret, Bubulcus coromandus (A)
Grey heron, Ardea cinerea
Great blue heron, Ardea herodias (A)
Black-headed heron, Ardea melanocephala 
Purple heron, Ardea purpurea
Great egret, Ardea alba
Intermediate egret, Ardea intermedia (A)
Black heron, Egretta ardesiaca (A)
Tricolored heron, Egretta tricolor (A)
Little blue heron, Egretta caerulea (A)
Snowy egret, Egretta thula (A)
Little egret, Egretta garzetta
Western reef heron, Egretta gularis

Pelicans
Order: PelecaniformesFamily: Pelecanidae

Pelicans are large water birds with a distinctive pouch under their beak.

Great white pelican, Pelecanus onocrotalus
Dalmatian pelican, Pelecanus crispus

Osprey
Order: AccipitriformesFamily: Pandionidae

Ospreys are large migratory fish-eating bird of prey. It is mainly brown above and white below with long, angled wings.

Osprey, Pandion haliaetus

Kites, hawks, and eagles
Order: AccipitriformesFamily: Accipitridae

A family of birds of prey which includes hawks, buzzards, eagles, kites and harriers. These birds have very large powerful hooked beaks for tearing flesh from their prey, strong legs, powerful talons and keen eyesight.

Black-winged kite, Elanus caeruleus
Bearded vulture, Gypaetus barbatus
Egyptian vulture, Neophron percnopterus (A)
European honey buzzard, Pernis apivorus
Crested honey buzzard, Pernis ptilorhynchus
Swallow-tailed kite, Elanoides forficatus (A)
White-backed vulture, Gyps africanus 
White-rumped vulture, Gyps bengalensis (A)
Rüppell's vulture, Gyps rueppelli (A)
Griffon vulture, Gyps fulvus
Cinereous vulture, Aegypius monachus
Lappet-faced vulture, Torgos tracheliotos (A)
Short-toed snake eagle, Circaetus gallicus
Lesser spotted eagle, Clanga pomarina
Greater spotted eagle, Clanga clanga
Booted eagle, Hieraaetus pennatus
Steppe eagle, Aquila nipalensis
Spanish imperial eagle, Aquila adalberti
Eastern imperial eagle, Aquila heliaca
Golden eagle, Aquila chrysaetos
Bonelli's eagle, Aquila fasciata
Levant sparrowhawk, Accipiter brevipes
Eurasian sparrowhawk, Accipiter nisus
Northern goshawk, Accipiter gentilis
Western marsh harrier, Circus aeruginosus
Hen harrier, Circus cyaneus
Northern harrier, Circus hudsonius (A)
Pallid harrier, Circus macrourus
Montagu's harrier, Circus pygargus
Red kite, Milvus milvus
Black kite, Milvus migrans
Pallas's fish eagle, Haliaeetus leucoryphus (A)
White-tailed eagle, Haliaeetus albicilla
Bald eagle, Haliaeetus leucocephalus (A)
Rough-legged buzzard, Buteo lagopus
Upland buzzard, Buteo hemilasius (A)
Long-legged buzzard, Buteo rufinus
Common buzzard, Buteo buteo

Barn owls
Order: StrigiformesFamily: Tytonidae

Barn owls are medium-sized to large owls with large heads and characteristic heart-shaped faces. They have long strong legs with powerful talons.

Western barn owl, Tyto alba
American barn owl, Tyto furcata

Typical owls
Order: StrigiformesFamily: Strigidae

Owls are a group of birds that belong to the order Strigiformes, constituting 200 extant bird of prey species. Most are solitary and nocturnal, with some exceptions (e.g., the northern hawk-owl). Owls hunt mostly small mammals, insects, and other birds, although a few species specialize in hunting fish.

Eurasian scops owl, Otus scops
Snowy owl, Bubo scandiacus
Eurasian eagle-owl, Bubo bubo
Tawny owl, Strix aluco
Maghreb owl, Strix mauritanica
Ural owl, Strix uralensis
Great grey owl, Strix nebulosa
Northern hawk-owl, Surnia ulula
Eurasian pygmy owl, Glaucidium passerinum
Little owl, Athene noctua
Boreal owl, Aegolius funereus
Brown boobook, Ninox scutulata
Long-eared owl, Asio otus
Short-eared owl, Asio flammeus
Marsh owl, Asio capensis (A)

Hoopoes
Order: BucerotiformesFamily: Upupidae

Distinctive birds with a long curved bill, a crest and black-and-white striped wings and tail.

Eurasian hoopoe, Upupa epops
African hoopoe, Upupa africana

Rollers
Order: CoraciiformesFamily: Coraciidae

A small family of colourful, medium-sized birds with a crow-like shape that feed mainly on insects.

Abyssinian roller, Coracias abyssinicus (A)
European roller, Coracias garrulus

Kingfishers
Order: CoraciiformesFamily: Alcedinidae

Kingfishers are medium-sized birds with large heads, long, pointed bills, short legs and stubby tails. 

White-throated kingfisher, Halcyon smyrnensis (A)
Common kingfisher, Alcedo atthis
Belted kingfisher, Megaceryle alcyon (A)
Pied kingfisher, Ceryle rudis (A)

Bee-eaters
Order: CoraciiformesFamily: Meropidae

A group of near-passerine birds characterised by richly coloured plumage, slender bodies and usually elongated central tail feathers.

Asian green bee-eater, Merops orientalis (A)
Blue-cheeked bee-eater, Merops persicus (A)
European bee-eater, Merops apiaster

Woodpeckers
Order: PiciformesFamily: Picidae

Woodpeckers are small to medium-sized birds with chisel-like beaks, short legs, stiff tails and long tongues used for capturing insects. Some species have feet with two toes pointing forward and two backward, while several species have only three toes. Many woodpeckers have the habit of tapping noisily on tree trunks with their beaks.

Eurasian wryneck, Jynx torquilla
Yellow-bellied sapsucker, Sphyrapicus varius (A)
Eurasian three-toed woodpecker, Picoides tridactylus
Middle spotted woodpecker, Dendrocoptes medius
Lesser spotted woodpecker, Dryobates minor
Syrian woodpecker, Dendrocopos syriacus
Great spotted woodpecker, Dendrocopos major
White-backed woodpecker, Dendrocopos leucotos
Northern flicker, Colaptes auratus (A)
Black woodpecker, Dryocopus martius
European green woodpecker, Picus viridis
Iberian green woodpecker, Picus sharpei
Grey-headed woodpecker, Picus canus

Falcons
Order: FalconiformesFamily: Falconidae

Falconidae is a family of diurnal birds of prey. They differ from hawks, eagles and kites in that they kill with their beaks instead of their talons.

Lesser kestrel, Falco naumanni
Common kestrel, Falco tinnunculus
American kestrel, Falco sparverius (A)
Red-footed falcon, Falco vespertinus
Amur falcon, Falco amurensis (A)
Eleonora's falcon, Falco eleonorae
Sooty falcon, Falco concolo (A)
Merlin, Falco columbarius
Eurasian hobby, Falco subbuteo
Lanner falcon, Falco biarmicus
Saker falcon, Falco cherrug
Gyrfalcon, Falco rusticolus
Peregrine falcon, Falco peregrinus

African and New World parrots
Order: PsittaciformesFamily: Psittacidae

In Europe, a species has established itself after being introduced by humans.

Monk parakeet, Myiopsitta monachus (I)

Old World parrots
Order: PsittaciformesFamily: Psittaculidae

In Europe, a species has established itself after being introduced by humans.

Rose-ringed parakeet, Psittacula krameri (I)

Tyrant flycatchers
Order: PasseriformesFamily: Tyrannidae

A family from the Americas with very rare vagrants recorded in Iceland, Ireland and Great Britain.

Eastern phoebe, Sayornis phoebe (A)
Olive-sided flycatcher, Contopus cooperi (A)
Eastern wood pewee, Contopus virens (A)
Yellow-bellied flycatcher, Empidonax flaviventris (A)
Acadian flycatcher, Empidonax virescens (A)
Willow flycatcher, Empidonax traillii (A)
Alder flycatcher, Empidonax alnorum (A)
Least flycatcher, Empidonax minimus (A)
Western kingbird, Tyrannus verticalis (A)
Fork-tailed flycatcher, Tyrannus savana (A)
Eastern kingbird, Tyrannus tyrannus (A)

Shrikes
Order: PasseriformesFamily: Laniidae

Shrikes are passerine birds known for their habit of catching other birds and small animals and impaling the uneaten portions of their bodies on thorns. A typical shrike's beak is hooked, like a bird of prey.

Brown shrike, Lanius cristatus (A)
Red-backed shrike, Lanius collurio
Isabelline shrike, Lanius isabellinus (A)
Red-tailed shrike, Lanius phoenicuroides (A)
Long-tailed shrike, Lanius schach (A)
Lesser grey shrike, Lanius minor
Northern shrike, Lanius borealis (A)
Great grey shrike, Lanius excubitor
Iberian grey shrike, Lanius meridionalis
Woodchat shrike, Lanius senator
Masked shrike, Lanius nubicus

Vireos, greenlets, and shrike-babblers
Order: PasseriformesFamily: Vireonidae

The vireos are a group of small to medium-sized passerine birds restricted to the New World and Southeast Asia.

White-eyed vireo, Vireo griseus (A)
Yellow-throated vireo, Vireo flavifrons (A)
Blue-headed vireo, Vireo solitarius (A)
Philadelphia vireo, Vireo philadelphicus (A)
Red-eyed vireo, Vireo olivaceus (A)

Figbirds and orioles
Order: PasseriformesFamily: Oriolidae

The figbirds and orioles are medium-sized passerines, mostly with bright and showy plumage, the females often have duller plumage than the males The beak is long, slightly curved and hooked. Orioles are arboreal and tend to feed in the canopy.

Eurasian golden oriole, Oriolus oriolus

Crows and jays
Order: PasseriformesFamily: Corvidae

The family Corvidae includes crows, ravens, jays, choughs, magpies, treepies, nutcrackers and ground jays. Corvids are above average in size among the Passeriformes, and some of the larger species show high levels of intelligence.

Siberian jay, Perisoreus infaustus
Eurasian jay, Garrulus glandarius
Iberian magpie, Cyanopica cooki (E)
Eurasian magpie, Pica pica
Spotted nutcracker, Nucifraga caryocatactes
Red-billed chough, Pyrrhocorax pyrrhocorax
Alpine chough, Pyrrhocorax graculus
Western jackdaw, Corvus monedula
Daurian jackdaw, Coloeus dauuricus (A)
House crow, Corvus splendens (A)
Rook, Corvus frugilegus
Carrion crow, Corvus corone
Hooded crow, Corvus cornix
Northern raven, Corvus corax
Fan-tailed raven, Corvus rhipidurus (A)

Waxwings
Order: PasseriformesFamily: Bombycillidae

The waxwings are a group of birds with soft silky plumage and unique red tips to some of the wing feathers. In the Bohemian and cedar waxwings, these tips look like sealing wax and give the group its name. These are arboreal birds of northern forests. They live on insects in summer and berries in winter.

Bohemian waxwing, Bombycilla garrulus
Cedar waxwing, Bombycilla cedrorum (A)

Tits and chickadees
Order: PasseriformesFamily: Paridae

The Paridae are mainly small stocky woodland species with short stout bills. Some have crests. They are adaptable birds, with a mixed diet including seeds and insects.

Coal tit, Periparus ater
Crested tit, Lophophanes cristatus
Sombre tit, Poecile lugubris
Grey-headed chickadee, Poecile cinctus
Marsh tit, Poecile palustris
Willow tit, Poecile montana
African blue tit, Cyanistes teneriffae
Eurasian blue tit, Cyanistes caeruleus
Azure tit, Cyanistes cyanus
Great tit, Parus major

Penduline tits
Order: PasseriformesFamily: Remizidae

The penduline tits are a group of small passerine birds related to the true tits. They are insectivores.

Eurasian penduline tit, Remiz pendulinus

Bearded reedling
Order: PasseriformesFamily: Panuridae

A single species formerly placed in the Old World babbler family.

Bearded reedling, Panurus biarmicus

Larks
Order: PasseriformesFamily: Alaudidae

Larks are small terrestrial birds with often extravagant songs and display flights. Most larks are fairly dull in appearance. Their food is insects and seeds.

Greater hoopoe-lark, Alaemon alaudipes (A)
Thick-billed lark, Ramphocoris clotbey (A)
Desert lark, Ammomanes deserti (A)
Bar-tailed lark, Ammomanes cinctura (A)
Woodlark, Lullula arborea
White-winged lark, Alauda leucoptera (A)
Oriental skylark, Alauda gulgula (A)
Eurasian skylark, Alauda arvensis
Thekla's lark, Galerida theklae (A)
Crested lark, Galerida cristata
Horned lark, Eremophila alpestris
Temminck's lark, Eremophila temmincki (A)
Greater short-toed lark, Calandrella brachydactyla
Bimaculated lark, Melanocorypha bimaciulata (A)
Calandra lark, Melanocorypha calandra (A)
Black lark, Melanocorypha yeltoniensis (A)
Dupont's lark, Chersophilus duponti
Asian short-toed lark, Alaudala cheleensis (A)
Mediterranean short-toed lark, Alaudala rufescens
Turkestan short-toed lark, Alaudala heinei

Bulbuls
Order: PasseriformesFamily: Pycnonotidae

Bulbuls are medium-sized songbirds. Some are colourful with yellow, red or orange vents, cheeks, throats or supercilia, but most are drab, with uniform olive-brown to black plumage. Some species have distinct crests.

White-eared bulbul, Pycnonotus leucotis
Common bulbul, Pycnonotus barbatus

Swallows and martins
Order: PasseriformesFamily: Hirundinidae

The family Hirundinidae is adapted to aerial feeding. They have a slender streamlined body, long pointed wings and a short bill with a wide gape. The feet are adapted to perching rather than walking, and the front toes are partially joined at the base.

Brown-throated martin, Riparia paludicola (A)
Sand martin, Riparia riparia
Pale martin, Riparia diluta
Tree swallow, Tachycineta bicolor (A)
Purple martin, Progne subis (A)
Barn swallow, Hirundo rustica
Eurasian crag martin, Ptyonoprogne rupestris
Pale crag martin, Ptyonoprogne obsoleta (A)
Rock martin, Ptyonoprogne fuligula (A)
Common house martin, Delichon urbica
Red-rumped swallow, Cecropis daurica (A)
American cliff swallow, Petrochelidon pyrrhonota

Cettia bush warblers and allies
Order: PasseriformesFamily: Cettiidae

Cettiidae is a family of small insectivorous songbirds. It contains the typical bush warblers (Cettia) and their relatives. Its members occur mainly in Asia and Africa, ranging into Oceania and Europe.

Cetti's warbler, Cettia cetti

Bushtits
Order: PasseriformesFamily: Aegithalidae

Bushtits are a group of small passerine birds with medium to long tails. They make woven bag nests in trees. Most eat a mixed diet which includes insects.

Long-tailed tit, Aegithalos caudatus

Leaf warblers and allies
Order: PasseriformesFamily: Phylloscopidae

Leaf warblers are small, active, insectivorous passerine birds. They glean the foliage for insects along the branches of trees and bushes. They forage at various levels within forests, from the top canopy to the understorey. Most of the species are markedly territorial both in their summer and winter quarters. Most are greenish or brownish above and off-white or yellowish below.

Wood warbler, Phylloscopus sibilatrix
Western Bonelli's warbler, Phylloscopus bonelli
Eastern Bonelli's warbler, Phylloscopus orientalis (A)
Hume's leaf warbler, Phylloscopus humei (A)
Yellow-browed warbler, Phylloscopus inornatus
Pallas's leaf warbler, Phylloscopus proregulus 
Radde's warbler, Phylloscopus schwarzi (A)
Dusky warbler, Phylloscopus fuscatus (A)
Plain leaf warbler, Phylloscopus neglectus (A)
Willow warbler, Phylloscopus trochilus
Mountain chiffchaff, Phylloscopus sindianus (A)
Canary Islands chiffchaff, Phylloscopus canariensis
Common chiffchaff, Phylloscopus collybita
Iberian chiffchaff, Phylloscopus brehmii
Eastern crowned warbler, Phylloscopus coronatus (A)
Green warbler, Phylloscopus nitidus (A)
Two-barred warbler, Phyloscopus plumbeitarsus (A)
Greenish warbler, Phylloscopus trochiloides
Large-billed leaf warbler, Phylloscopus magnirostris (A)
Pale-legged leaf warbler, Phylloscopus tenellipes (A)
Kamchatka leaf warbler, Phylloscopus examinandus (A)
Arctic warbler, Phylloscopus borealis

Reed warblers, Grauer’s warbler, and allies
Order: PasseriformesFamily: Acrocephalidae

The species in this family are usually rather large warblers. Most are rather plain olivaceous brown above with much yellow to beige below. They are usually found in open woodland, reedbeds, or tall grass. The family occurs mostly in southern to western Eurasia and surroundings, but also ranges far into the Pacific, with some species in Africa.

Great reed warbler, Acrocephalus arundinaceus
Clamorous reed warbler,  Acrocephalus stentoreus (A)
Moustached warbler, Acrocephalus melanopogon
Aquatic warbler, Acrocephalus paludicola
Sedge warbler, Acrocephalus schoenobaenus
Paddyfield warbler, Acrocephalus agricola (A)
Blyth's reed warbler, Acrocephalus dumetorum
Common reed warbler, Acrocephalus scirpaceus
Marsh warbler, Acrocephalus palustris
Thick-billed warbler, Arundinax aedon (A)
Booted warbler, Iduna caligata (A)
Sykes's warbler, Iduna rama (A)
Eastern olivaceous warbler, Iduna pallida
Western olivaceous warbler, Iduna opaca
Upcher's warbler, Hippolais languida (A)
Olive-tree warbler, Hippolais olivetorum
Melodious warbler, Hippolais polyglotta
Icterine warbler, Hippolais icterina

Grassbirds and allies
Order: PasseriformesFamily: Locustellidae

Grassbirds are small insectivorous songbirds, with tails that are usually long and pointed. These birds occur mainly in Eurasia, Africa, and the Australian region. They are less wren-like than the typical shrub-warblers (Cettia) but like these drab brownish or buffy all over. Many have bold dark streaks on wings and/or underside. Most live in scrubland and frequently hunt food by clambering through thick tangled growth or pursuing it on the ground; they are perhaps the most terrestrial of the "warblers".

Gray's grasshopper warbler, Helopsaltes fasciolatus (A)
Pallas's grasshopper warbler, Helopsaltes certhiola (A)
Lanceolated warbler, Locustella lanceolata (A)
River warbler, Locustella fluviatilis
Savi's warbler, Locustella luscinioides
Common grasshopper warbler, Locustella naevia

Cisticolas and allies
Order: PasseriformesFamily: Cisticolidae

Cisticolas are generally very small birds of drab brown or grey appearance found in open country such as grassland or scrub. They are often difficult to see and many species are similar in appearance, so the song is often the best identification guide. These are insectivorous birds which nest low in vegetation.

Zitting cisticola, Cisticola juncidis
Graceful prinia, Prinia gracilis

Sylviid babblers
Order: PasseriformesFamily: Sylviidae

The sylviid warblers are a group of small insectivorous passerine birds. They mainly occur as breeding species, as the common name implies, in Europe, Asia and, to a lesser extent, Africa. Most are of generally undistinguished appearance, but many have distinctive songs.

Eurasian blackcap, Sylvia atricapilla
Garden warbler, Sylvia borin
Barred warbler, Curruca nisoria
Desert whitethroat, Curruca minula (A)
Lesser whitethroat, Curruca curruca
Hume's whitethroat, Curruca althaea (A)
Western Orphean warbler, Curruca hortensis
Eastern Orphean warbler, Curruca crassirostris
African desert warbler, Curruca deserti (A)
Asian desert warbler, Curruca nana (A)
Tristram's warbler, Curruca deserticola 
Menetries's warbler, Curruca mystacea (A)
Rüppell's warbler, Curruca ruppeli
Cyprus warbler, Curruca melanothorax
Sardinian warbler, Curruca melanocephala
Western subalpine warbler, Curruca iberiae
Moltoni's warbler, Curruca subalpina
Eastern subalpine warbler, Curruca cantillans
Common whitethroat, Curruca communis
Spectacled warbler, Curruca conspicillata
Marmora's warbler, Curruca sarda
Dartford warbler, Curruca undata
Balearic warbler, Curruca balearica (E)

Laughingthrushes, barwings, and sibias
Order: PasseriformesFamily: Leiothrichidae

The laughingthrushes are a family of Old World passerine birds. They are diverse in size and coloration. These are birds of tropical areas, with the greatest variety in Southeast Asia and the Indian subcontinent.

Red-billed leiothrix, Leiothrix lutea (I)

Goldcrests and kinglets
Order: PasseriformesFamily: Regulidae

The kinglets, also called crests, are a small group of birds often included in the Old World warblers, but frequently given family status because they also resemble the titmice.

Common firecrest, Regulus ignicapillus
Goldcrest, Regulus regulus
Madeira firecrest, Regulus madeirensis
Ruby-crowned kinglet, Corthylio calendula (A)

Wrens
Order: PasseriformesFamily: Troglodytidae

The wrens are mainly small and inconspicuous except for their loud songs. These birds have short wings and thin down-turned bills. Several species often hold their tails upright. All are insectivorous.

Marsh wren, Cistothorus palustris
Eurasian wren, Troglodytes troglodytes

Nuthatches
Order: PasseriformesFamily: Sittidae

Nuthatches are small woodland birds. They have the unusual ability to climb down trees head first, unlike other birds which can only go upwards. Nuthatches have big heads, short tails and powerful bills and feet.

Krüper's nuthatch, Sitta krueperi
Red-breasted nuthatch, Sitta canadensis (A)
Corsican nuthatch, Sitta whiteheadi (E)
Western rock nuthatch, Sitta neumayer
Eurasian nuthatch, Sitta europaea

Wallcreeper
Order: PasseriformesFamily: Tichodromidae

The wallcreeper is a small bird related to the nuthatch family, which has stunning crimson, grey and black plumage.

Wallcreeper, Tichodroma muraria

Treecreepers
Order: PasseriformesFamily: Certhiidae

Treecreepers are small woodland birds, brown above and white below. They have thin pointed down-curved bills, which they use to extricate insects from bark. They have stiff tail feathers, like woodpeckers, which they use to support themselves on vertical trees.

Eurasian treecreeper, Certhia familiaris
Short-toed treecreeper, Certhia brachydactyla

Mockingbirds and thrashers
Order: PasseriformesFamily: Mimidae

Medium-sized passerine birds with long tails. Some are notable for their ability to mimic sounds such as other birds' songs.

Grey catbird, Dumetella carolinensis (A)
Northern mockingbird, Mimus polyglottos (A)
Brown thrasher, Toxostoma rufum (A)

Starlings and rhabdornis
Order: PasseriformesFamily: Sturnidae

Starlings are small to medium-sized passerine birds. Their flight is strong and direct and they are very gregarious. Their preferred habitat is fairly open country. They eat insects and fruit. Plumage is typically dark with a metallic sheen.

Crested myna, Acridotheres cristatellus (I)
Daurian starling, Agropsar sturninus (A)
Rosy starling, Pastor roseus
Common starling, Sturnus vulgaris
Spotless starling, Sturnus unicolor

Thrushes
Order: PasseriformesFamily: Turdidae

The thrushes are a group of passerine birds that occur mainly in the Old World. They are plump, soft plumaged, small to medium-sized insectivores or sometimes omnivores, often feeding on the ground. Many have attractive songs.

Siberian thrush, Geokichla sibirica (A)
White's thrush, Zoothera aurea
Scaly thrush, Zoothera dauma (A)
Varied thrush, Ixoreus naevius (A)
Veery, Catharus fuscescens (A)
Grey-cheeked thrush, Catharus minimus (A)
Swainson's thrush, Catharus ustulatus (A)
Hermit thrush, Catharus guttatus (A)
Wood thrush, Hylocichla mustelina (A)
Tickell's thrush, Turdus unicolor (A)
Ring ouzel, Turdus torquatus
Common blackbird, Turdus merula
Eyebrowed thrush, Turdus obscurus (A)
Black-throated thrush, Turdus atrogularis
Red-throated thrush, Turdus ruficollis (A)
Naumann's thrush, Turdus naumanni (A)
Dusky thrush, Turdus naumanni
Fieldfare, Turdus pilaris
Redwing, Turdus iliacus
Song thrush, Turdus philomelos
Mistle thrush, Turdus viscivorus
American robin, Turdus migratorius (A)

Chats and Old World flycatchers
Order: PasseriformesFamily: Muscicapidae

Old World flycatchers are a large group of small passerine birds native to the Old World. They are mainly small arboreal insectivores. The appearance of these birds is highly varied, but they mostly have weak songs and harsh calls.

Rufous-tailed scrub robin, Cercotrichas galactotes
Spotted flycatcher, Muscicapa striata
Mediterranean flycatcher, Muscicapa tyrrhenica
Dark-sided flycatcher, Muscicapa sibirica (A)
Asian brown flycatcher, Muscicapa dauurica (A)
European robin, Erithacus rubecula
Siberian blue robin, Larvivora cyane (A)
Rufous-tailed robin, Larvivora sibilans (A)
Bluethroat, Luscinia svecica
Thrush nightingale, Luscinia luscinia
Common nightingale, Luscinia megarhynchos
White-throated robin, Irania gutturalis 
Siberian rubythroat, Calliope calliope (A)
Red-flanked bluetail, Tarsiger cyanurus
Taiga flycatcher, Ficedula albicilla (A)
Red-breasted flycatcher, Ficedula parva (A)
Semicollared flycatcher, Ficedula semitorquata
European pied flycatcher, Ficedula hypoleuca
Collared flycatcher, Ficedula albicollis
Atlas pied flycatcher, Ficedula speculigera (A)
Eversmann's redstart, Phoenicurus erythronotus
Black redstart, Phoenicurus ochruros
Common redstart, Phoenicurus phoenicurus
Moussier's redstart, Phoenicurus moussieri (A)
Plumbeous water redstart, Phoenicurus fuliginosus (A)
Common rock thrush, Monticola saxatilis
Blue rock thrush, Monticola solitarius
Whinchat, Saxicola rubetra
Canary Islands stonechat, Saxicola dacotiae
European stonechat, Saxicola rubicola
Siberian stonechat, Saxicola maurus
Amur stonechat, Saxicola stejnegeri 
African stonechat, Saxicola torquatus 
Pied bush chat, Saxicola caprata	 (A)
Northern wheatear, Oenanthe oenanthe
Isabelline wheatear, Oenanthe isabellina
Desert wheatear, Oenanthe deserti (A)
Western black-eared wheatear, Oenanthe hispanica
Eastern black-eared wheatear, Oenanthe melanoleuca
Cyprus wheatear, Oenanthe cypriaca
Pied wheatear, Oenanthe pleschanka
Red-rumped wheatear, Oenanthe moesta (A)
Variable wheatear, Oenanthe picata (A)
Black wheatear, Oenanthe leucura
White-crowned wheatear, Oenanthe leucopyga (A)
Finsch's wheatear, Oenanthe finschii (A)
Kurdish wheatear, Oenanthe xanthoprymna (A)

Dippers
Order: PasseriformesFamily: Cinclidae

Dippers are a group of perching birds whose habitat includes aquatic environments in the Americas, Europe and Asia. They are named for their bobbing or dipping movements.

White-throated dipper, Cinclus cinclus

Old World sparrows and snowfinches
Order: PasseriformesFamily: Passeridae

Sparrows are small passerine birds. In general, sparrows tend to be small, plump, brown or grey birds with short tails and short powerful beaks. Sparrows are seed-eaters and they also consume small insects.

House sparrow, Passer domesticus
Italian sparrow, Passer italiae
Spanish sparrow, Passer hispaniolensis
Dead Sea sparrow, Passer moabiticus (A)
Eurasian tree sparrow, Passer montanus
Rock sparrow, Petronia petronia
White-winged snowfinch, Montifringilla nivalis

Weavers and widowbirds
Order: PasseriformesFamily: Ploceidae

The weavers are small passerine birds related to the finches. They are seed-eating birds with rounded conical bills. The males of many species are brightly coloured, usually in red or yellow and black, some species show variation in colour only in the breeding season.

Black-headed weaver, Ploceus melanocephalus (I)
Yellow-crowned bishop, Euplectes afer (I)

Waxbills, munias and allies
Order: PasseriformesFamily: Estrildidae

The estrildid finches are small passerine birds of the Old World tropics and Australasia. They are gregarious and often colonial seed eaters with short thick but pointed bills. They are all similar in structure and habits, but have wide variation in plumage colours and patterns.

Scaly-breasted munia, Lonchura punctulata (I)
Tricolored munia, Lonchura malacca (I)
Chestnut munia, Lonchura atricapilla (I)
Common waxbill, Estrilda astrild (I)
Red avadavat, Amandava amandava (I)

Accentors
Order: PasseriformesFamily: Prunellidae

The accentors are in the only bird family, Prunellidae, which is completely endemic to the Palearctic. They are small, fairly drab species superficially similar to sparrows.

Alpine accentor, Prunella collaris
Siberian accentor, Prunella montanella (A)
Radde's accentor, Prunella ocularis
Black-throated accentor, Prunella atrogularis (A)
Dunnock, Prunella modularis

Wagtails and pipits
Order: PasseriformesFamily: Motacillidae

The Motacillidae are a family of small passerine birds with medium to long tails. They include the wagtails, longclaws and pipits. They are slender, ground feeding insectivores of open country.

Western yellow wagtail, Motacilla flava
Eastern yellow wagtail, Motacilla tschutschensis 
Citrine wagtail, Motacilla citreola
Grey wagtail, Motacilla cinerea
White wagtail, Motacilla alba
Richard's pipit, Anthus richardi
Paddyfield pipit, Anthus rufulus (A)
Blyth's pipit, Anthus godlewskii (A)
Tawny pipit, Anthus campestris
Long-billed pipit, Anthus similis (A)
Meadow pipit, Anthus pratensis
Tree pipit, Anthus trivialis
Olive-backed pipit, Anthus hodgsoni (A)
Pechora pipit, Anthus gustavi (A)
Red-throated pipit, Anthus cervinus
Buff-bellied pipit, Anthus rubescens (A)
Water pipit, Anthus spinoletta
Eurasian rock pipit, Anthus petrosus
Berthelot's pipit, Anthus berthelotii

Finches and euphonias
Order: PasseriformesFamily: Fringillidae

Finches are seed-eating passerine birds, that are small to moderately large and have a strong beak, usually conical and in some species very large. All have twelve tail feathers and nine primaries. These birds have a bouncing flight with alternating bouts of flapping and gliding on closed wings, and most sing well.

Common chaffinch, Fringilla coelebs
Tenerife blue chaffinch, Fringilla teydea
Gran Canaria blue chaffinch, Fringilla polatzeki
Brambling, Fringilla montifringilla
Evening grosbeak, Hesperiphona vespertina (A)
Hawfinch, Coccothraustes coccothraustes
Pine grosbeak, Pinicola enucleator
Eurasian bullfinch, Pyrrhula pyrrhula
Azores bullfinch, Pyrrhula murina
Asian crimson-winged finch, Rhodopechys sanguineus
Trumpeter finch, Bucanetes githagineus
Mongolian finch, Bucanetes mongolicus
Grey-crowned rosy finch, Leucosticte tephrocotis
Common rosefinch, Carpodacus erythrinus
Great rosefinch, Carpodacus rubicilla (A)
Pallas's rosefinch, Carpodacus roseus (A)
European greenfinch, Chloris chloris
Twite, Linaria flavirostris
Common linnet, Linaria cannabina
Common redpoll, Acanthis flammea
Lesser redpoll, Acanthis cabararet
Arctic redpoll, Acanthis hornemanni
Parrot crossbill, Loxia pytyopsittacus
Scottish crossbill, Loxia scotica (E)
Red crossbill, Loxia curvirostra
Two-barred crossbill, Loxia leucoptera
European goldfinch, Carduelis carduelis
Citril finch, Carduelis citrinella
Corsican finch, Carduelis corsicana
Red-fronted serin, Serinus pusillus (A)
European serin, Serinus serinus
Atlantic canary, Serinus canaria
Cape canary, Serinus canicollis (A)
Eurasian siskin, Spinus spinus

Longspurs and snow buntings
Order: PasseriformesFamily: Calcariidae

The Calcariidae are a family of birds that had been traditionally grouped with the New World sparrows, but differ in a number of respects and are usually found in open grassy areas.

Lapland longspur, Calcarius lapponicus
Snow bunting, Plectrophenax nivalis

Buntings
Order: PasseriformesFamily: Emberizidae

The emberizids are a large family of passerine birds. They are seed-eating birds with distinctively shaped bills. Many emberizid species have distinctive head patterns.

Corn bunting, Emberiza calandra
Yellowhammer, Emberiza citrinella
Pine bunting, Emberiza leucocephalos (A)
Rock bunting, Emberiza cia
Grey-necked bunting, Emberiza buchanani (A)
Cinereous bunting, Emberiza cineracea
Ortolan bunting, Emberiza hortulana
Cretzschmar's bunting, Emberiza caesia
Cirl bunting, Emberiza cirlus
Striolated bunting, Emberiza striolata
House bunting, Emberiza sahari (A)
Chestnut-eared bunting, Emberiza fucata (A)
Little bunting, Emberiza pusilla
Yellow-browed bunting, Emberiza chrysophrys (A)
Rustic bunting, Emberiza rustica
Yellow-breasted bunting, Emberiza aureola (A)
Chestnut bunting, Emberiza rutila (A)
Black-headed bunting, Emberiza melanocephala'''
Red-headed bunting, Emberiza bruniceps (A)
Black-faced bunting, Emberiza spodocephala (A)
Masked bunting, Emberiza personata'
Pallas's reed bunting, Emberiza pallasi (A)
Common reed bunting, Emberiza schoeniclus

New World sparrows and bush tanagers
Order: PasseriformesFamily: Passerellidae

The New World sparrows (or American sparrows) are a large family of seed-eating passerine birds with distinctively finch-like bills.

Lark sparrow, Chondestes grammacus (A)
Red fox sparrow, Passerella iliaca (A)
American tree sparrow, Spizelloides arborea (A)
Dark-eyed junco, Junco hyemalis 
White-crowned sparrow, Zonotrichia leucophrys (A)
White-throated sparrow, Zonotrichia albicollis (A)
Savannah sparrow, Passerculus sandwichensis (A)
Song sparrow, Melospiza melodia (A)
Lincoln's sparrow, Melospiza lincolnii (A)
Eastern towhee, Pipilo erythrophthalmus (A)

Yellow-breasted chat
Order: PasseriformesFamily: Icteriidae

This species was historically placed in the wood-warblers (Parulidae) but nonetheless most authorities were unsure if it belonged there. It was placed in its own family in 2017.

Yellow-breasted chat, Icteria virens (A)

Oropendolas, orioles, and blackbirds
Order: PasseriformesFamily: Icteridae

Icterids make up a family of small- to medium-sized, often colorful, New-World passerine birds. Most species have black as a predominant plumage color, often enlivened by yellow, orange or red. The species in the family vary widely in size, shape, behavior and coloration.

Yellow-headed blackbird, Xanthocephalus xanthocephalus (A)
Bobolink, Dolichonyx oryzivorus (A)
Baltimore oriole, Icterus galbula (A)
Red-winged blackbird, Agelaius phoeniceus (A)
Brown-headed cowbird, Molothrus ater (A)
Rusty blackbird, Euphagus carolinus (A)
Common grackle, Quiscalus quiscula (A)

New World warblers
Order: PasseriformesFamily: Parulidae

A group of small, often colourful passerine birds restricted to the New World. Most are arboreal and insectivorous.

Ovenbird, Seiurus aurocapilla (A)
Louisiana waterthrush, Parkesia motacilla (A)
Northern waterthrush, Parkesia noveboracensis (A)
Golden-winged warbler, Vermivora chrysoptera (A)
Blue-winged warbler, Vermivora cyanoptera (A)
Black-and-white warbler, Mniotilta varia (A)
Prothonotary warbler, Protonotaria citrea (A)
Tennessee warbler, Leiothlypis peregrina (A)
Orange-crowned warbler, Leiothlypis celata (A)
Nashville warbler, Leiothlypis ruficapilla (A)
Connecticut warbler, Oporornis agilis (A)
Mourning warbler, Geothlypis philadelphia (A)
Common yellowthroat, Geothlypis trichas (A)
Hooded warbler, Setophaga citrina (A)
American redstart, Setophaga ruticilla (A)
Cape May warbler, Setophaga tigrina (A)
Cerulean warbler, Setophaga cerulea (A)
Northern parula, Setophaga americana (A)
Magnolia warbler, Setophaga magnolia (A)
Bay-breasted warbler, Setophaga castanea (A)
Blackburnian warbler, Setophaga fusca (A)
American yellow warbler, Setophaga aestiva (A)
Chestnut-sided warbler, Setophaga pensylvanica (A)
Blackpoll warbler, Setophaga striata (A)
Black-throated blue warbler, Setophaga caerulescens (A)
Palm warbler, Setophaga palmarum (A)
Pine warbler, Setophaga pinus (A)
Myrtle warbler, Setophaga coronata (A)
Audubon's warbler, Setophaga auduboni (A)
Yellow-throated warbler, Setophaga dominica (A)
Prairie warbler, Setophaga discolor (A)
Black-throated green warbler, Setophaga virens (A)
Canada warbler, Cardellina canadensis (A)
Wilson's warbler, Cardellina pusilla (A)

Cardinals and allies
Order: PasseriformesFamily: Cardinalidae

Cardinals are passerine birds found in North and South America. They are also known as cardinal-grosbeaks and cardinal-buntings.

Summer tanager, Piranga rubra (A)
Scarlet tanager, Piranga olivacea (A)
Rose-breasted grosbeak, Pheucticus ludovicianus (A)
Dickcissel, Spiza americana (A)
Blue grosbeak, Pheucticus caerulea (A)
Indigo bunting, Passerina cyanea (A)

See also
Lists of birds by region
The EBCC Atlas of European Breeding Birds

References
Checklist of birds of Europe. Avibase, LePage, Denis. 14 February 2020
Mullarney, Killian; Svensson, Lars, Zetterstrom, Dan; Grant, Peter. (2001). Birds of Europe. Princeton University Press. pp. 74–5 
BirdLife International (2004) Birds in the European Union: a status assessment.
Crochet P.-A., Joynt G. (2015) AERC list of Western Palearctic birds. July 2015 version.
Rouco, M., Copete, J. L., De Juana, E., Gil-Velasco, M., Lorenzo, J. A., Martín, M., Milá, B., Molina, B. & Santos, D. M. (2019) Lista de las aves de España. Edición de 2019. SEO/BirdLife. Madrid.
Rafael Matias, Paulo Catry, Helder Costa, Gonçalo Elias, João Jara, C.C. Moore & Ricardo Tomé (2007) Lista sistemática das aves de portugal continental. Anuário Ornitológico 5: 74-132 (2007)
British Ornithologists’ Union (2017) The British List: A Checklist of Birds of Britain (9th edition). Ibis 160: 190-240.
Irish Rare Birds Committee (2015) The Irish list as on 31 December 2015
Overzicht van alle vogels waargenomen in Nederland, Dutch Avifauna.nl
Belgian Rare Birds Committee (2014) Belgian official checklist
Hellenic Rarities Committee (2016) List of the birds of Greece
Yann Kolbeinsson (2011) List of Icelandic Bird Species
Birdlife Suomi Finland: Suomessa havaitut luonnonvaraiset ei-varpuslinnut (non-passerine birds of Finland)
Birdlife Suomi Finland: Suomessa havaitut luonnonvaraiset varpuslinnut (passerine birds of Finland)
Netfugl.dk: Bird list of Denmark

 
Birds
Europe